Gen¹³/Monkeyman and O'Brien is crossover between Art Adams's creator-owned Monkeyman and O'Brien and WildStorm's Gen¹³. The story is a retelling of the well-known Star Trek episode "Mirror, Mirror" with different characters.

References
 Gen¹³/Monkeyman and O'Brien @ comicbookdb

WildStorm limited series
Intercompany crossovers